William Knowles is the name of:

William Standish Knowles (1917–2012), American chemist
William Erskine Knowles (1872–1951), Canadian Liberal MP (1906–1921)
William David Knowles (1908–2000), Canadian Progressive Conservative MP (1968–1979)
William James Knowles (1832–1927), Irish amateur archaeologist
W. C. G. Knowles (William Charles Goddard Knowles, 1908–1969), British businessman in Hong Kong

See also
William Knollys, 1st Earl of Banbury (1544–1632), English nobleman at court of Elizabeth I